William Lane was an American Negro league infielder in the 1910s.

Lane played for the Chicago Giants and the Chicago American Giants in 1911. In 20 recorded games, he posted 16 hits in 71 plate appearances.

References

External links
Baseball statistics and player information from Baseball-Reference Black Baseball Stats and Seamheads

Year of birth missing
Year of death missing
Place of birth missing
Place of death missing
Chicago American Giants players
Chicago Giants players
Baseball infielders